The 2017 European Karate Championships, the 52nd edition, was held in İzmit, Turkey from 4 to 7 May 2017. A total of 490 competitors from 43 countries participated at the event.

Medalists

Men's competition

Individual

Team

Women's competition

Individual

Team

Medal table

Participating countries

References

External links
 Results

European Karate Championships
International karate competitions hosted by Turkey
European Karate Championships
2017 in karate
Sport in İzmit
Karate competitions in Turkey
European Karate Championships